Wilsons Plains is a rural locality in the Scenic Rim Region, Queensland, Australia. In the  Wilsons Plains had a population of 50 people.

History 
The Fassifern railway line (Queensland's first branch railway line) opened from Ipswich to Harrisville on 10 July 1882. On 12 September 1887 the line was extended to Dugundan with Wilsons Plains being served by Wilsons Plains railway station on the corner of Wilsons Plains Road and Redhill Road. The line closed in June 1964.

In the  Wilsons Plains had a population of 50 people.

Geography
Warrill Creek forms the north-western boundary.

Road infrastructure
The Cunningham Highway passes close to the western extremity.

Heritage listing
Wilsons Plains has the following heritage-listed sites:
 422 Wilsons Plains Road: Trelawney Cheese Factory Refrigerator Shed

References

Scenic Rim Region
Localities in Queensland